Germán Martín Centurión Marecos (born 5 May 1980) is a retired Paraguayan footballer.

External links
 
 

1980 births
Living people
Paraguayan footballers
Paraguayan expatriate footballers
Argentinos Juniors footballers
San Lorenzo de Almagro footballers
Club Almagro players
Quilmes Atlético Club footballers
Club Olimpia footballers
Club Guaraní players
Deportivo Pasto footballers
Club Universitario de Deportes footballers
Independiente Santa Fe footballers
12 de Octubre Football Club players
The Strongest players
Cúcuta Deportivo footballers
Categoría Primera A players
Argentine Primera División players
Bolivian Primera División players
Paraguayan expatriate sportspeople in Argentina
Paraguayan expatriate sportspeople in Colombia
Paraguayan expatriate sportspeople in Peru
Paraguayan expatriate sportspeople in Bolivia
Expatriate footballers in Argentina
Expatriate footballers in Colombia
Expatriate footballers in Peru
Expatriate footballers in Bolivia
Association football defenders